John Matias (August 15, 1944 – April 7, 2020) was a professional baseball player who played for the Chicago White Sox of Major League Baseball (MLB) in 1970, playing 58 games and hitting .188 with 2 homers. After beginning his professional baseball career in the Baltimore Orioles organization, he was traded along with Luis Aparicio and Russ Snyder to the White Sox for Don Buford, Bruce Howard and Roger Nelson on November 29, 1967. He was dealt along with Gail Hopkins from the White Sox to the Kansas City Royals for Pat Kelly and Don O'Riley on October 13, 1970. He never played in the majors again following the transaction.

He died on April 7, 2020 at his home.

References

External links

1944 births
2020 deaths
Aberdeen Pheasants players
American expatriate baseball players in Mexico
Baseball players from Honolulu
Bluefield Orioles players
Chicago White Sox players
Elmira Pioneers players
Evansville White Sox players
Fox Cities Foxes players
Hawaii Islanders players
Indios de Ciudad Juárez (minor league) players
Lynchburg White Sox players
Major League Baseball first basemen
Major League Baseball left fielders
Major League Baseball right fielders
Omaha Royals players
Stockton Ports players
Tacoma Twins players
Tigres del México players
Tucson Toros players